Andrew Baird may refer to:

 Andrew Baird (footballer) (1866–1916), Scottish footballer
 Andrew Blain Baird (1862–1951), Scottish blacksmith and aviation pioneer
 Andrew Wilson Baird (1842–1908), Scottish colonel of the Royal Engineers
 Andy Baird (born 1979), Scottish footballer
Andrew Baird (film director), Irish film director (born 1976)